The 2018 DXC Technology 600 was the ninth round of the 2018 IndyCar Series season, contested over 248 laps at the 1.5-mile (2.4 km) Texas Motor Speedway in Fort Worth, Texas. Josef Newgarden claimed his fourth pole and lead Team Penske 1-2-3, while Scott Dixon claimed his 43rd career win and took the championship lead.

Results

Qualifying

Race

Notes:
 Points include 1 point for leading at least 1 lap during a race, an additional 2 points for leading the most race laps, and 1 point for Pole Position.

Championship standings after the race

Drivers' Championship standings

Manufacturer standings

 Note: Only the top five positions are included.

References

2018
2018 in IndyCar
2018 in sports in Texas
2018 DXC Technology 600
June 2018 sports events in the United States